Celebrity Big Brother was a celebrity edition of Big Brother. It lasted for 23 days, starting on 21 July 2002 and ending on 12 August 2002. A proportion of the profits from Eviction votes went to charities. This was the only series of Celebrity Big Brother that was made as a part of the Big Brother Australia format. This series used the same house from Big Brother 2, which itself used the house from Big Brother 1, but slightly remodeled. The bathroom was off limits to the cameras.

Several guest celebrities appeared briefly in the series on only a temporary basis without becoming a housemate. These included Carla Bonner (Neighbours actress) and Bert Newton. Warwick Capper was ejected from the house for flashing his penis at Kimberley Cooper during an argument.

Housemates

Nominations table 
The first housemate in each box was nominated for two points, and the second housemate was nominated for one point.

Summary

References

External links 
 Celebrity Big Brother official website (archived on Internet Archive)

2002 Australian television seasons
2002 Australian television series debuts
2002 Australian television series endings
Big Brother (Australian TV series)
Australia